The Second Mother may refer to:
The Second Mother (1925 film), a German film directed by Heinrich Bolten-Baeckers
The Second Mother (2015 film), a Brazilian film directed by Anna Muylaert